The 1910–11 NHA season was the second season of the now defunct National Hockey Association. The Ottawa Hockey Club won the league championship. Ottawa took over the Stanley Cup from the Montreal Wanderers and defended it against teams from Galt, Ontario, and Port Arthur, Ontario .

League business
The annual meeting was held November 12, 1910, electing the following executive:

 Emmett Quinn (president and secretary)

Directors:

 Eddie McCafferty, Wanderers
 John Ambrose O'Brien, Renfrew
 W. P. Humphrey, Shamrocks
 George Kennedy, Canadiens
 Joe Power, Quebec

The Shamrocks resigned from the league and were not replaced. The Club Athletique-Canadien and the Quebec Hockey Club were granted franchises. Haileybury and Cobalt left the league. Club-Athletique-Canadien had made a claim on the Canadiens name and threatened a lawsuit if they were not granted a franchise. There are three written descriptions of this transaction. Coleman(1966) writes that George Kennedy, president of the CAC bought the Haileybury franchise. In Andy O'Brien's book, Ambrose O'Brien is quoted as saying that he sold the Canadiens to Kennedy. In Holzman's book, the franchise was given to Kennedy, but Kennedy had to pay O'Brien for the rights to Newsy Lalonde. In The Globe of March 7, 1911, it is claimed that Lalonde's sale was the first ever sale of a player.

The NHA decided to impose a $5,000 per team salary cap.

A second meeting, on November 26, 1910, updated the Board of Directors to:

 D'Arcy McGee, Ottawa
 James A. Barnett, Renfrew
 Adolphe Lecours, Canadiens
 Joe Power, Quebec
 Eddie McCafferty, Wanderers

The salary cap, while opposed by the players was upheld at the meeting.

Source: Coleman, p. 201–203.

Salary cap

The salary cap of $5,000 per club caused a situation where Bruce Stuart of Ottawa threatened a mass defection to a new league. However, the players found that the Arena Company, owners of the Montreal Arena would not rent to the players. There was no other suitable arena in Montreal available for a new league and the players had no choice but to abandon the effort. Some players took a large cut in salary: Marty Walsh, Fred Lake and Dubbie Kerr were paid $600 each where they had been paid $1,200 each in 1910. The dispute caused the cancellation of a pre-season exhibition series in New York for the Ottawas and Wanderers.

Rule changes

Games were changed from two periods of 30 minutes, to three periods of twenty minutes, with ten-minute rest periods. The Spalding hockey puck was adopted as the standard puck.

Regular season

Final standings

Stanley Cup challenges

Ottawa played two challenges after the season at The Arena in Ottawa.

Galt vs. Ottawa

Port Arthur vs. Ottawa

Marty Walsh was a "one-man wrecking crew", scoring ten goals against Port Arthur.

Post-season exhibition series
After the season a series was arranged between Renfrew and Montreal Wanderers and Ottawa to play in New York. Renfrew and Montreal played first, with the winner to play-off against Ottawa. After the Wanderers defeated Renfrew 18–5 (13–4, 4–1), Ottawa won a $2,500 prize for the two-game series winning 12–7 ( 7–2, 5–8 ).

Ottawa and Montreal then played a two-game series in Boston on March 22 and March 25, 1911 (the first game being the first professional hockey game in Boston). Ottawa won a $2,500 purse by a total score of 13–11 (5–7, 8–4). Ottawa had picked up Cyclone Taylor from Renfrew to play in the Boston exhibition games.

 Sources

Schedule and results

† Protested by Renfrew.

‡ Replay of protested game.

Player statistics

Goaltending averages

Scoring leaders

Stanley Cup engraving
The 1911 Stanley Cup was presented by the trophy's trustee William Foran. The Ottawa Hockey Club never did engrave their names on the Cup for their championship season.  

The following Ottawa Hockey Club players and staff were members of the Stanley Cup winning team.

1910–11 Ottawa Hockey Club Senators

See also
National Hockey Association
List of pre-NHL seasons
List of Stanley Cup champions
1910 in sports
1911 in sports

References

Bibliography
 
 
 
 Podnieks, Andrew; Hockey Hall of Fame (2004). Lord Stanley's Cup. Triumph Books, 12, 50. .

Notes

External links
Oilers Heritage: The NHA

1910–11 in Canadian ice hockey by league
National Hockey Association seasons